The Existential Negation Campaign was a former project of the now-defunct Flat Earth Society website (http://www.flat-earth.org). The Campaign was an absurdist venture. Visitors to the website could download an image that read, "WARNING: THIS OBJECT DOES NOT EXIST" and were encouraged to make stickers or signs out of them. These stickers or signs could then be placed on random objects. 

The mission statement from the Flat Earth Society website:
"This campaign focuses on the consensus-reality definition of existence and existential status. This definition is challenged by affixing to various objects which are popularly believed to exist labels which read "WARNING: THIS OBJECT DOES NOT EXIST"."

See also
Culture jamming
Operation Mindfuck
Guerrilla communication

Existentialism